Brohm is a surname. Notable people with the surname include:

Brian Brohm (born 1985), American football quarterback and coach
Jean-Marie Brohm (born 1940), French sociologist, anthropologist, and philosopher
Jeff Brohm (born 1971), American football quarterback and coach